Zia Pueblo (Eastern Keres: Tsi'ya, Ts'iiy'a) is a census-designated place (CDP) in Sandoval County, New Mexico, United States. The population was 646 at the 2000 census, with 310 males and 336 females. The pueblo after which the CDP is named is included within the CDP; it is listed on the National Register of Historic Places.

Zia Pueblo is part of the Albuquerque Metropolitan Statistical Area.

Geography
According to the United States Census Bureau, the CDP has a total area of 27.3 square miles (70.8 km), of which 27.3 square miles (70.7 km) is land and 0.04 square mile (0.1 km) (0.15%) is water.

Demographics

As of the census of 2000, there were 646 people, 155 households, and 137 families residing in the CDP. The population density was 23.7 people per square mile (9.1/km). There were 189 housing units at an average density of 6.9 per square mile (2.7/km). The racial makeup of the CDP was 99.85% Native American, and 0.15% from two or more races. Hispanic of any race were 0.46% of the population.

There were 155 households, out of which 43.9% had children under the age of 18 living with them, 43.9% were married couples living together, 37.4% had a female householder with no husband present, and 11.0% were non-families. 10.3% of all households were made up of individuals, and 1.3% had someone living alone who was 65 years of age or older. The average household size was 4.17 and the average family size was 4.38.

In the CDP, the population was spread out, with 34.8% under the age of 18, 12.4% from 18 to 24, 28.5% from 25 to 44, 18.3% from 45 to 64, and 6.0% who were 65 years of age or older. The median age was 27 years. For every 100 females, there were 92.3 males. For every 100 females age 18 and over, there were 87.1 males.

The median income for a household in the CDP was $34,583, and the median income for a family was $37,679. Males had a median income of $20,313 versus $19,271 for females. The per capita income for the CDP was $8,689. About 15.0% of families and 15.4% of the population were below the poverty line, including 18.6% of those under age 18 and 9.1% of those age 65 or over.

Education
It is within the Jemez Valley Public Schools school district.

The Bureau of Indian Education (BIE) operates the T'siya Day School (formerly Zia Day School), a federal elementary school for Native Americans, in Zia Pueblo.

See also

 List of census-designated places in New Mexico
 Zia people (New Mexico)
 National Register of Historic Places listings in Sandoval County, New Mexico

References

Further reading
 Sims, Christine P. (1996) Native Language Communities: a descriptive study of two community efforts to preserve their native languages National Indian Policy Center, The George Washington University, Washington. D.C., 
 Stanley, Francis (1969) The Zia, New Mexico Story no publisher listed, Pep, Texas, 
 Stevenson, Matilda Coxe (1894) The Sia (extract from the Eleventh Annual Report of the Bureau of Ethnology) Government Printing Office, Washington. D.C., 
 White, Leslie A. (1962) The Pueblo of Sia, New Mexico  (U.S. Bureau of American Ethnology, Bulletin 184) Government Printing Office, Washington. D.C., ; reprinted as White, Leslie A. (1974) Zia: the sun symbol pueblo Calvin Horn Publisher, Albuquerque,

External links

 American Southwest, a National Park Service Discover Our Shared Heritage Travel Itinerary

Albuquerque metropolitan area
Census-designated places in New Mexico
Census-designated places in Sandoval County, New Mexico
Historic districts on the National Register of Historic Places in New Mexico
National Register of Historic Places in Sandoval County, New Mexico

ca:Zia